Toni is a Philippine talk show created by All TV and Toni Gonzaga Studios (TGS), hosted and produced by Toni Gonzaga-Soriano. The show premiered on All TV on October 3, 2022.

References

All TV (Philippines) original programming
2020s Philippine television series
2022 Philippine television series debuts
Filipino-language television shows
Philippine television talk shows
Television shows filmed in the Philippines